The  was an art museum located in Nagoya, Japan.

History 
It was the sister museum of the Museum of Fine Arts, Boston (the MFA) and was established in partnership with the Foundation for the Arts, Nagoya (FAN) partly to help bring the treasures of the MFA's collection, particularly those of types rarely exhibited in Japan, to the country. The museum formally opened on April 17, 1999.

Each year, the MFA, Boston sent two five-month loan exhibitions to the Nagoya museum; longer-term, five year exhibits were also provided. Despite the desire of N/BMFA's curators to display primarily Japanese and Impressionist art, the MFA, Boston had insisted on a more wide-ranging display. A small number of items were, nevertheless, sent regularly for the Nagoya museum's "Japanese corner".

The Nagoya museum was described as part of Boston's Malcolm Rogers' attempt to "internationalize" the institution.

The museum suffered financial difficulties due to low visitor numbers, which resulted in its eventual closure in October 2018. Its final exhibition, "In Pursuit of Happiness: Favorite Works from the Museum of Fine Arts, Boston", was held between July and October of that year.

Location

The museum operated a 4,700 square meter (50,590 ft²) facility on three levels, including 1,400 square meters (15,069 ft²) of exhibition galleries. The architecture of the museum was contemporary but nonetheless meant to reflect that of the neoclassical MFA building in Boston, especially its white granite facade. A 31-story hotel building is attached to the building that housed the museum.

It was accessible from Kanayama Station on the Central Japan Railway, the local Meitetsu rail system, and the Nagoya City Subway.

See also
 Museum of Fine Arts, Boston

References

External links
Nagoya/Boston MFA website
Boston MFA opens Nagoya outpost
Art From West Unveiled in New Nagoya Museum from the New York Times, April 18, 1999

Art museums established in 1999
Museum of Fine Arts, Boston
Art museums and galleries in Nagoya
1999 establishments in Japan